Ethelreda Leopold (July 2, 1914January 26, 1998) was an American film actress. She appeared in approximately 65 films between 1934 and 1972. She also appeared in commercials.

Leopold is familiar to modern viewers for her roles in several Three Stooges, Andy Hardy, and Abbott and Costello films. She also had bit parts in such American classics as Angels Over Broadway and Charlie Chaplin's The Great Dictator, and also supported other celebrated film comedians such as Harold Lloyd and Laurel and Hardy.

Many of her film roles were small or uncredited. She appeared at the 1990 Three Stooges convention.

Biography 
Leopold was from Chicago and could play piano and draw. She went to St. Ignatius grammar school and Sullivan High School. Leopold studied at the Chicago Art Institute for some time before she was discovered as an actress. She began acting at age 17 after a scout for Warner Brothers saw her "modeling teen-age fashions," according to the New York Times. The first film she was in was Dames, where she was part of the chorus line. She was the winner of a "popularity contest" for the group of 109 "Busby Berkeley" girls and became part of a promotional tour after she was filmed for Gold Diggers in Paris. As part of the tour, H. Allen Smith took her vital measurements and wrote about her tour.

Leopold died in North Hollywood on January 26, 1998, from pneumonia.

Filmography

References

Citations

Sources

External links

 

1914 births
1998 deaths
American film actresses
American television actresses
20th-century American actresses
Actresses from Chicago